The FIA WTCC Race of UK event was a round of the World Touring Car Championship that took place in the United Kingdom. It was last held at Donington Park near Castle Donington in Leicestershire.

The race had previously been held at Donington Park from 2002, when the series was known as the European Touring Car Championship but with promotion to world championship status, the event switched to Silverstone in Northamptonshire for 2005. The race was moved to Brands Hatch in Kent for 2006, where it used the full Grand Prix layout. In 2011, the race moved back to Donington Park. The race was left out of the 2012 schedule. In 2012, World Touring Car Championship promoter Marcello Lotti said the Race of UK was unlikely to return to the calendar in 2013 as the series looked to expand to events outside Europe.

During the running of the event, Andy Priaulx was the only British driver to win his home event. He won twice at Brands Hatch, firstly in race two of the 2007 event and then in race two at the 2010 meeting.

Winners

References

External links 

 Donington Park Official Site

Uk
World Touring Car Championship